Santiago de Chuco is a city in Peru, capital of Santiago de Chuco Province,  La Libertad Region.

History

On July 23, 1553 it was obtained permission to found a town that served as the capital and hub of mining and wheat. Captain Don Diego de la Serna, immigrants Domingo Perez Vasquez, Jose Pelaez, Lino Benítes of Children, Miguel de Estremadura, Rodrigo of Bejarano, Fernando de Alva, Garcia de Paredes, Lorenzo de Alcantara, Juan Baptist father Ruiz and Francisco de Asis Centurion reached Andaymarca, a native of Santiago de Compostela, who helped  Santiago the "greatest"  be the tutelary patron of the new town.

Notable people 
 César Vallejo
 Luis de la Puente Uceda
 Pablo Uceda
 Eladio Ruiz Cerna

See also
La Libertad Region

External links 
The information in this article is based on that in its Spanish equivalent.

Cities in La Libertad Region
Populated places in La Libertad Region
Populated places established in 1553